This is a list of women artists who were born in Morocco or whose artworks are closely associated with that country.

A 

 Aassmaa Akhannouch (born 1973), photographer

B
Yto Barrada (born 1971), visual artist

E
Latifa Echakhch (born 1974), contemporary artist, based in Switzerland
Safaa Erruas (born 1976), contemporary artist

K
Bouchra Khalili (born 1975), visual artist

L
Radia Bent Lhoucine (1912–1994), painter

M
Najia Mehadji (born 1950), French-Moroccan contemporary artist

T
Chaïbia Talal (1929–2004), painter

References

-
Moroccan women artists, List of
Artists, List of Moroccan
artists, List of Moroccan